Nikolaos "Nikos" Dendias (born 7 October 1959) is a Greek lawyer and politician of the conservative New Democracy party. He is a Member of the Hellenic Parliament for Athens, and was Minister for National Defence from November 2014 to January 2015. As of 2019, he is the Foreign Minister of Greece.

Early life and education 
Dendias was born in Corfu in 1959, but he originates from the island of Paxos. He went to school in the Athens College, received a degree in law from the National and Kapodistrian University of Athens, a Master of Laws in Maritime and Insurance Law from the University College London and in Criminology from the London School of Economics.

Political career

Early beginnings
A practising lawyer, Dendias has been active in New Democracy since 1978, first as a member of ND's student wing, DAP-NDFK and later as a party functionary in the Youth Organisation of New Democracy. He was elected as an MP for Corfu in the Greek parliament in the 2004, 2007, 2009 and June 2012 elections.

Career in government
On 8 January 2009, Dendias was named as Minister for Justice in the second cabinet of Kostas Karamanlis, serving briefly until the cabinet's resignation on 7 October 2009, following ND's defeat in the elections of 4 October. In the coalition cabinet of Antonis Samaras, formed after the June 2012 elections, he has first held the post of Minister for Public Order and Citizen Protection (21 June 2012 – 10 June 2014). During his time in office, he was confronted with increasing political and anti-immigrant violence. His agency was the subject of criticism over refusing asylum to Syrian refugees and detaining other migrants that flock to its borders under "unacceptable" conditions.  Also, Dendidas assigned the police antiterrorism unit to probe the activities of Greece's neo-Nazi Golden Dawn party and proposed a law that could block state funding for party.

In two 2014 reshuffles, Dendias became Minister for Development and Competitiveness (10 June – 3 November 2014), from  3 November 2014 to 27 January 2015, and later Minister for National Defence.

Minister of Foreign Affairs, 2019–present
Since 9 July 2019 Dendias has been serving as the Foreign Minister of Greece in Prime Minister Kyriakos Mitsotakis's New Democracy-led government which won the 2019 Greek legislative election. In August 2019, Dendias summoned the Turkish ambassador to "express Greece's deep discontent" with the arrival of sixteen boats carrying about 650 people from Turkey on Greece's Lesbos island.

In October 2019, Dendias condemned Turkey's invasion of Syria, stating that "Turkey is making a big mistake". Furthermore, about Turkey's plans for the creation of a safe zone in Northern Syria for the Syrian refugees to be resettled, at the expense of the local Kurdish population he stated that it "is illegal since the resettlement of immigrants must comply with some basic principles: to be voluntary and dignified. [...] Therefore, what Turkey does, goes against human rights".

There is a long-standing dispute between Turkey and Greece in the Aegean Sea. Dendias said that "Turkey is the only (party) responsible for the escalation of tension in the eastern Mediterranean, and it must immediately leave the Greek continental shelf."

In May 2021, he called for a two-state solution to resolve the Israeli–Palestinian conflict.

Immediately after the 2022 Russian invasion of Ukraine, Dendias summoned the Russian ambassador to Greece to protest against the fact that Greek nationals were killed and six others wounded by Russian bombing near the Ukrainian city of Mariupol. 

During an official visit to Armenia on 27 September 2022, Dendias stated: "We believe in the inviolability of borders, and I am referring to" the September 2022 Armenia–Azerbaijan clashes "that happened just a few days ago following the shelling of Armenian territory, including inhabited areas, by the Azeri military forces."

On 12 February 2023, Dendias traveled to Turkey in a new round of Greek–Turkish earthquake diplomacy following the 2023 Turkey–Syria earthquake. He was received by his Turkish counterpart Mevlüt Çavuşoğlu, and the two foreign ministers toured an operations centre coordinating rescue efforts in Antakya, observed the devastation to the city from the air, and visited a camp where international rescue teams are based.

References

External links 
  
 

1959 births
20th-century Greek lawyers
Living people
National and Kapodistrian University of Athens alumni
Alumni of University College London
Alumni of the London School of Economics
Politicians from Corfu
New Democracy (Greece) politicians
Greek MPs 2004–2007
Greek MPs 2007–2009
Greek MPs 2009–2012
Greek MPs 2012 (May)
Greek MPs 2012–2014
Greek MPs 2015 (February–August)
Greek MPs 2015–2019
Greek MPs 2019–2023
MPs of Corfu
Ministers of National Defence of Greece
Justice ministers of Greece
Ministers of Public Order of Greece
Foreign ministers of Greece